"Lazy Lamhe"  is a seduction song written by Prasoon Joshi and composed by Shankar–Ehsaan–Loy for the film Thoda Pyaar Thoda Magic. Picturised on Saif Ali Khan, Ameesha Patel and Rani Mukerji, the song features vocals by Anusha Mani.

The scene in which the song was featured was when Saif, Rani and the child artistes arrive at a pool party hosted by Ameesha Patel, who starts singing and dancing with Saif while Rani and the child artistes spoil her party attempting to terminate the affair between Saif and Ameesha. The music video was shot in fifteen days.

Anusha Mani, the vocalist of the song, was nominated for a New Musical Sensation (Female) award at Stardust Awards.

References

Hindi film songs
Songs with music by Shankar–Ehsaan–Loy
2008 songs
Songs with lyrics by Prasoon Joshi
Pop-folk songs